Robert, Bob, or Bobby Curtis may refer to:

 Robert Curtis (actor), British actor
 Robert Curtis (basketball) (1990–2017), American basketball player
 Robert Curtis (British Army soldier) (1950–1971), first British Army soldier killed during the Northern Ireland Troubles
 Bob Curtis (actor) (1932–2004), American actor and priest
 Bob Curtis (American football) (1935–2013), American football coach
 Bob Curtis (footballer) (1950–2010), English football player
 Bob Curtis (politician) (born 1933), American politician
 Bobby Curtis (American football) (born 1964), American football linebacker
 Bobby Curtis (runner) (born 1984), American distance runner
 Bobby Curtis (Scottish footballer), early 20th-century Scottish footballer

See also
 Robert Curtis Brown (born 1957), American actor
 Robert Curtis Clark (born 1937), Canadian politician